Darwin Ireland (born May 26, 1971) is a former American football linebacker. He attended Dollarway High School, and played for the Chicago Bears for three games from 1994 to 1995.

References

1971 births
Living people
American football linebackers
Arkansas Razorbacks football players
Chicago Bears players